David Vanderbilt is a professor of physics at Rutgers University researching condensed-matter physics since 1991, and named Board of Governors Professor of Physics in 2009. He received his B.A. from Swarthmore College in 1976 and his Ph.D. from MIT in 1981 studying under John D. Joannopoulos. He received the Aneesur Rahman Prize for Computational Physics in 2006. The Aneesur Rahman prize is the highest honor given by the American Physical Society for work in computational physics. In 2013 he was elected to the National Academy of Science.

References

External links
 Research page from Rutgers University Physics department

American people of Dutch descent
21st-century American physicists
Rutgers University faculty
Living people
Computational physicists
Swarthmore College alumni
Massachusetts Institute of Technology alumni
Members of the United States National Academy of Sciences
Year of birth missing (living people)
Fellows of the American Physical Society